Aslana is a town located in Damoh district in Madhya Pradesh, India.

References

Damoh
Cities and towns in Damoh district